Oligosoma is a genus of small to medium-sized skinks (family Scincidae) found only in New Zealand, Norfolk Island and Lord Howe Island. Oligosoma had previously been found to belong to the Eugongylus group of genera in the subfamily Lygosominae; the Australian genus Bassiana appears to be fairly closely related.

Species
The currently described species are:
Oligosoma acrinasum  – Fiordland skink
Oligosoma aeneum  – copper skink
Oligosoma alani  – Alan's skink, robust skink
Oligosoma albornense  – Alborn skink
Oligosoma auroraense  – Hawke's Bay skink, eastern speckled skink 
Oligosoma awakopaka  – Awakopaka skink
Oligosoma burganae  – Burgan skink
Oligosoma chloronoton  – green skink
Oligosoma elium  – Marlborough spotted skink
Oligosoma fallai  – Falla's skink, Three Kings skink
Oligosoma grande  – grand skink
Oligosoma hardyi  – Hardy's skink
Oligosoma homalonotum  – chevron skink
Oligosoma hoparatea  – Pukuma skink, white-bellied skink 
Oligosoma inconspicuum  – cryptic skink
Oligosoma infrapunctatum  – cobble skink, speckled skink 
Oligosoma judgei  – barrier skink 
Oligosoma kahurangi 
Oligosoma kakerakau 
Oligosoma kokowai  – northern spotted skink
Oligosoma levidensum  – slight skink
Oligosoma lichenigerum  – Lord Howe and Norfolk Islands skink
Oligosoma lineoocellatum  – Canterbury spotted skink 
Oligosoma longipes  – long-toed skink
Oligosoma maccanni  – McCann's skink 
Oligosoma macgregori  – MacGregor's skink
Oligosoma microlepis  – small-scaled skink
Oligosoma moco  – Moko skink
Oligosoma newmani  – Newman's speckled skink
Oligosoma nigriplantare  – Chatham Islands skink 
Oligosoma northlandi  – Northland skink(extinct)
Oligosoma notosaurus  – southern skink
Oligosoma oliveri  – marbled skink, Oliver's New Zealand skink 
Oligosoma ornatum  – Gray's ornate skink 
Oligosoma otagense  – Otago skink 
Oligosoma pachysomaticum  – Coromandel skink
Oligosoma pikitanga  – Sinbad skink
Oligosoma polychroma  – common New Zealand skink, southern grass skink
Oligosoma prasinum  – Mackenzie skink 
Oligosoma repens  – Eyres skink
Oligosoma robinsoni  - crenulate skink, Hokitika skink, cobble skink 
Oligosoma roimata  – Aorangi skink
Oligosoma salmo  – Chesterfield skink
Oligosoma smithi  – shore skink
Oligosoma stenotis  – small-eared skink
Oligosoma striatum  – striped skink
Oligosoma suteri  – egg-laying skink, Suter's skink
Oligosoma taumakae  – Open Bay Islands skink, Taumaka skink 
Oligosoma tekakahu  – Te Kakahu skink 
Oligosoma toka  – Nevis skink
Oligosoma townsi  - Mokohinau skink
Oligosoma waimatense  – scree skink
Oligosoma whitakeri  – Whitaker's New Zealand skink
Oligosoma zelandicum  – brown skink

A binomial authority in parentheses indicates that the species was originally described in a genus other than Oligosoma.

Merger of Oligosoma and Cyclodina
A molecular phylogenetic analysis has merged the genus Cyclodina with Oligosoma, rendering Cyclodina an obsolete taxon.

References

Further reading
Girard, C. (1857). "Descriptions of some new Reptiles, collected by the United States Exploring Expedition, under the command of Capt. Charles Wilkes, U. S. N. Fourth Part.— Including the species of Saurians, exotic to North America". Proc. Acad. Nat. Sci. Philadelphia 9: 195–199. (Oligosoma, new genus, p. 196).
Jewell, T. (2011) A Photographic Guide to Reptiles and Amphibians of New Zealand. Auckland: New Holland (revised edition).

External links

North Island Oligosoma spp. skink recovery plan 2002–2012
Conservation status of New Zealand reptiles, 2021

 
Reptiles of New Zealand
Lizard genera
Taxa named by Charles Frédéric Girard